Roel Stoffels (born 10 January 1987) is a Dutch former professional footballer.

Career
Born in Leidschendam, Stoffels signed a two-year contract with ADO Den Haag in September 2007. He made 14 appearances for them in the Eerste Divisie during the 2007–08 season, before being released by the club in March 2009. He later played in the Topklasse for Haaglandia and Excelsior Maassluis.

References

1987 births
Living people
Dutch footballers
People from Leidschendam
ADO Den Haag players
Haaglandia players
Excelsior Maassluis players
Eerste Divisie players
Derde Divisie players
Association football midfielders
Footballers from South Holland